Valanjerd Rural District is a rural district (dehestan) in the Central District of Borujerd County, Lorestan Province, Iran. At the 2006 census, its population was 7,607 in 1,883 families.  The rural district has 19 villages.

References 

Rural Districts of Lorestan Province
Borujerd County